Jeffrey Urbach is an American physicist, currently focusing in biophysics of cellular dynamics and mechanics and physics of Soft Matter at Georgetown University and is an Elected Fellow of the American Physical Society.

References

Year of birth missing (living people)
Living people
Georgetown University faculty
21st-century American physicists
Amherst College alumni
Stanford University alumni
Fellows of the American Physical Society